Marjorie Cox may refer to:

 Marjorie Cox Crawford, Australian tennis player
 Dame Marjorie Sophie Cox, British public servant (created a Dame Commander of the Order of the British Empire in 1950)